Île-de-France tramway Line 6 (usually called simply T6) is part of the modern tram network of the Île-de-France region of France. Line T6 connects Châtillon – Montrouge Paris Métro station and  Viroflay-Rive-Droite station, south-west of Paris. Line T6 has the specificity of being one of the Île-de-France's two rubber-tyred tramway lines. It opened to the public on 13 December 2014.

Line T6 is operated by the Régie autonome des transports parisiens (RATP) under the authority of Île-de-France Mobilités.

Route

See also 
 List of rubber-tyred tram systems

Notes and references 

Tram lines in Île-de-France
Ile-de-France tramway Line 6
2014 establishments in France